Henry Geovanny León León (born April 20, 1983) is an Ecuadorian football player who plays for Serie A club Técnico Universitario. He formerly played for Universidad Católica, Barcelona, ESPOLI.

External links

El Universo Newspaper

 

1983 births
Living people
Footballers from Quito
Association football midfielders
Ecuadorian footballers
Ecuadorian Serie A players
C.D. ESPOLI footballers
C.D. Universidad Católica del Ecuador footballers
El Gouna FC players
Barcelona S.C. footballers
C.D. Olmedo footballers
C.S.D. Independiente del Valle footballers
C.S. Emelec footballers
Ecuadorian expatriate footballers
Expatriate footballers in Egypt
Ecuadorian expatriate sportspeople in Egypt